Major-General Alexander Vass Anderson  (17 November 1895 – 17 October 1963) was a senior British Army officer of the Second World War.

Military career
Anderson was born in Poona, India, the son of Lieutenant Colonel Alexander Vass Anderson (1856-1933), of the Indian Medical Service. He attended the Royal Military Academy, Woolwich and commissioned into the Royal Engineers on 12 August 1914. Between 1915 and 1918 he served in the First World War, during which he was Mentioned in Dispatches. He was promoted to captain on 3 November 1917.

In 1921, Anderson was attached to the 2nd Queen Victoria's Own Madras Sappers and Miners and saw active service in the Malabar rebellion. On 2 June 1923 he was made a Member of the Order of the British Empire for his services during the conflict. Anderson remained in India, and from 1934 to 1937 was Deputy Assistant Adjutant General for India. Between 1937 and 1939 he was Commanding Officer, Queen Victoria's Own Madras Sappers and Miners. During the Second World War, Anderson returned to the United Kingdom where he was appointed Assistant Quarter-Master General (AQMG), Home Forces in 1940 and Colonel in charge of Administration, Home Forces until 1942. He then worked at the War Office, before serving as Deputy Quarter-Master General (DQMG), British Army Staff in Washington, D.C. In January 1945 he was invested as a Companion of the Order of the Bath. From August 1944 to April 1947, Anderson was Director of Civil Affairs at the War Office and retired with the rank of major-general in June 1949. He was awarded the Legion of Merit by the United States on 16 January 1947.

Anderson married firstly, in 1918, Estelle Bell, daughter of George Henry Gasson, of Queenstown and East London, South Africa; the second of their three sons was the director and film critic Lindsay Anderson. He married secondly, in 1935, Aileen Elizabeth (1902-1981), daughter of Stanley James Stevenson, of Edinburgh, and widow of Major T. J. Barnes, of the 64th Pioneers. Although Lindsay Anderson's friend Gavin Lambert writes, in 'Mainly About Lindsay Anderson: A Memoir' (Faber and Faber, 2000, p. 18), that Alexander Vass Anderson 'cut (his first family) out of his life', making no reference to them in his 'Who's Who' entry, Lindsay often saw his father and looked after his house and dogs when he was away.

Birth - Stonehaven Journal - Thursday 12 December 1895, p 3

References

Bibliography

External links
British Army Officers 1939–1945
Generals of World War II

1895 births
1963 deaths
Military personnel from Aberdeenshire
British Army major generals
British Army generals of World War II
British Army personnel of World War I
Companions of the Order of the Bath
Companions of the Order of St Michael and St George
Graduates of the Royal Military Academy, Woolwich
Graduates of the Staff College, Camberley
Members of the Order of the British Empire
Officers of the Legion of Merit
Officers of the Order of Orange-Nassau
People from Stonehaven
Royal Engineers officers
War Office personnel in World War II